Oleiharenicola alkalitolerans is a Gram-negative,  strictly aerobic, neutrophilic and non-motile bacterium from the genus of Oleiharenicola which has been isolated from a oil sand tailings pond in Canada.

References

Verrucomicrobiota
Bacteria described in 2018